2,4,6-Trimethylpyridine (2,4,6-collidine) is an organic compound which belongs to the heterocycles (more precisely, heteroaromatics). It consists of a pyridine ring substituted with three methyl groups. It belongs to the substance group of the collidines, a group of six constitutional isomers. 2,4,6-trimethylpyridine is the most well-known isomer of this group.

Properties
The compound has a refractive index of 1.4959 (25 °C).

Preparation
2,4,6-Trimethylpyridine was isolated from Dippel's oil in 1854. A synthesis can be carried out analogously to the Hantzsch's dihydropyridine synthesis from ethyl acetoacetate (as β-ketocarbonyl compound), acetaldehyde and ammonia in the ratio 2: 1: 1.

Use
By oxidation of the methyl groups with potassium permanganate collidinic acid is obtained.

2,4,6-Trimethylpyridine is used in organic syntheses (for example, for dehydrohalogenation), by binding the formed hydrogen halides.

See also
 2,6-Dimethylpyridine (lutidine)

References 

Pyridines
Non-nucleophilic bases